The Kulina spiny-rat (Proechimys kulinae) or Javari spiny rat, is a spiny rat species found in Brazil and Peru.

Phylogeny
Morphological characters and mitochondrial cytochrome b DNA sequences showed that P. kulinae belongs to the so-called gardneri group of Proechimys species. Within this clade, Proechimys kulinae is the sister species to P. gardneri and P. pattoni.

References

Proechimys
Mammals described in 1998
Taxa named by Maria Nazareth Ferreira da Silva